Musti is a Flemish animated children's television series created by Ray Goossens. It first aired in 1968, but new episodes have been made over the decades in more sophisticated animation, even going to 3D animation from 2007 on.

Concept
Musti is a small childlike anthropomorphic cat. He lives with his parents and friends Mr. Rabbit, Miss Tortoise, Miss Hedgehog and Mr. Dog. The stories are simple tales, usually not longer than five minutes in length. The show's target audience are toddlers.

In total, 156 episodes have been made, airing in Belgium, the Netherlands, Canada, Turkey, Japan, Portugal, and 18 other countries.

In 2007, a new television series has been created. Instead of the flat 2D images with a white background, the new series is entirely rendered in 3D. The new series airs in Belgium, The Netherlands, Israel, Norway, Japan, Croatia, Portugal and the United States on BabyFirst TV. Al-Jazeera also airs the series throughout the Arabic world.

The original narrator was Rachel Frederix. Since 2007, her successor is Kristel Van Craen.

In the Netherlands, Musti appeared on television in 1980. The narrators were Arnold Gelderman and Marijke Merckens. The series was shown on BabyFirst TV in the United States.

In France, Belgium and Canada, the narrator since 2007 was Emmanuelle Delchambre.

Books
The Flemish publisher Standaard Uitgeverij carries an extensive portfolio of Musti children's books, targeting children 3–6.

Another publisher Dupuis, printed a number of Musti children's comics in French, based on its appearances in the magazine Bonne Soirée.

Software
Recently, a number of educational software programs were developed with Musti as the lead character. They are currently only available in Dutch.

International airings 
 Argentina: América 2
 Australia: Canal ABC
 Bolivia: Red ATB
 Canada: Treehouse TV, 2007-2011
 Chile: Canal 13, on the children's show Cubox
 Colombia: Señal Colombia
 Cuba: Multivisión
 Ecuador: Ecuador TV
 El Salvador: Canal 19 (Nickelodeon)
 France: France 5 Teletoon
 Germany: KiKa
 India: Disney Junior
 Israel: Arutz HaYeladim
 Italy: Rai YoYo and Rai 2
 Japan: WOWOW
 Latin America: Discovery Kids
 Mexico: Canal 5
 Panama: FETV Canal 5
 Poland: TVP1
 Portugal: Canal Panda and RTP2
 Scandinavia: Playhouse Disney
 Southeast Asia: Disney Channel
 South Korea: KBS
 Spain: Clan and Boomerang
 Sweden: SVT and STVB
 Turkey: TRT
 Uruguay: Canal 5 - Televisión Nacional Uruguay
 United States: BabyFirst
 United Kingdom: Nick Jr.
 Venezuela: TVes and Cartoon Network

See also
 Miffy
 Hello Kitty

References

External links
 
 Musti books and software (Dutch)
 Discussion about the resemblance between Hello Kitty and Musti

1968 Belgian television series debuts
1960s animated television series
Belgian children's animated television series
Animal tales
Television shows adapted into novels
Television shows adapted into comics
Animated television series about cats
Animated television series about children
1960s preschool education television series
Animated preschool education television series